Virginia's 21st House of Delegates district elects one of 100 seats in the Virginia House of Delegates, the lower house of the state's bicameral legislature. District 21 consists of Virginia Beach and Chesapeake. It has been represented by Kelly Fowler since 2018.

District officeholders

References

External links
 

Virginia House of Delegates districts
Chesapeake, Virginia
Virginia Beach, Virginia